Vapotherm Inc. is a publicly held corporation based in Exeter, New Hampshire that was founded in 1999 as a medical device manufacturer after creating the first heated and humidified high flow therapy nasal cannula system.

Vapotherm Precision Flow 
In 2009, Vapotherm released a new flagship product replacing the Vapotherm 2000i (that had been recalled in 2005, and then re-approved for use in the market in 2006); boasting a completely integrated electronic flow meter and electronic blender, as well as an internal oxygen analyzer.  The Precision Flow is currently Vapotherm's flagship capital unit and is the premier medical device for providing high flow therapy.

Precision Flow Heliox 
Through an agreement with Praxair, Vapotherm provides a Precision Flow model specially calibrated specifically for 80:20 heliox gas for use in patients who may benefit from heliox therapy.

Vapotherm Q50 Compressor 
In November 2015 Vapotherm announced its own model of medical air compressor, specifically to be used with their flagship Precision Flow device.

Vapotherm 2000i

Recall controversy
In 2005, contaminated Vapotherm 2000i respiratory gas humidification devices were associated with an outbreak of Ralstonia mannitolilytica bacteria in children in the United States.  Vapotherm issued a recall of all 2000i devices on 13 October 2005.  Vapotherm worked with the CDC and FDA to revise the operating manual and reduce risk to patients, and the 2000i was reintroduced on 1 February 2007.

References

External links 
 

1999 establishments in Maryland
Exeter, New Hampshire
Manufacturing companies established in 1999
Health care companies established in 1999
Medical technology companies of the United States
Health care companies based in New Hampshire
Companies based in Rockingham County, New Hampshire
Companies listed on the New York Stock Exchange
2018 initial public offerings